The White House Office of the Curator is charged with the conservation and study of the collection of fine art, furniture, and decorative objects used to furnish both the public and private rooms of the White House as an official residence and as an accredited historic house museum.

The office began in 1961 during the administration of President John F. Kennedy while First Lady Jacqueline Kennedy oversaw the restoration of the White House. The office is located in the ground floor of the White House Executive Residence. The office, headed by the curator of the White House, includes an associate curator, an assistant curator, and a curatorial assistant. The office works with the chief usher, the Committee for the Preservation of the White House, and the White House Historical Association.

The most recent White House curator is Lydia Tederick, appointed in 2017. 
Previously it was William G. Allman, who was appointed by President George W. Bush in 2002 and retired in June 2017.

Curators' charge
The curator of the White House, or less formally White House curator, is head of the White House Office of the Curator which is charged with the conservation and study of the collection of fine art, furniture, and decorative objects used to furnish both the public and private rooms of the White House.

The first curator of the White House was Lorraine Waxman Pearce, appointed in March 1961. Pearce graduated from the preservation program at the Henry Francis du Pont Winterthur Museum.

Curators of the White House

To date, seven curators have served in the White House; they are:

See also
 Art in the White House
 Committee for the Preservation of the White House
 White House Historical Association

Footnotes

References
 Abbott James A., and Elaine M. Rice. Designing Camelot: The Kennedy White House Restoration. Van Nostrand Reinhold: 1998. .
 Garrett, Wendell. Our Changing White House. Northeastern University Press: 1995. .
 Monkman, Betty C. The White House: The Historic Furnishing & First Families. Abbeville Press: 2000. .
 The White House: An Historic Guide. White House Historical Association and the National Geographic Society: 2001. .

External links
 White House website biography of curator William G. Allman

White House
White House Executive Residence Operations
Rooms in the White House
White House Curators
Jacqueline Kennedy Onassis